Harsdorf is a municipality in the district of Kulmbach in Bavaria in Germany.

City arrangement

Harsdorf is arranged in the following boroughs:

 Altenreuth
 Brauneck
 Harsdorf
 Haselbach
 Hettersreuth
 Holzlucken
 Lettenhof
 Oberlaitsch /Seyerhaus
 Oberlohe
 Ritterleithen 
 Sandreuth
 Unitz
 Unterlohe
 Zettmeisel

References

Kulmbach (district)